Pioneer is a planning area located in the West Region of Singapore, named after Pioneer Road, formerly Jalan Besi. The area is bounded by Jurong West to the north, Boon Lay to the east, Tuas to the west, the Western Water Catchment to the northwest and Selat Jurong to the south, and contains the Joo Koon, Benoi and Gul Circle industrial estates.

During the development of Jurong Industrial Estate, JTC Corporation renamed to English the Malay-named roads that ply the area, especially those near Jalan Buroh. Pioneer Road was Jalan Besi (Malay: Metal Road), while Pioneer Road North was Jalan Bandaran (Malay: Town Road) and Pioneer Circus was Bulatan Besi (Malay: Metal Circus or Metal Circle).

References

 
West Region, Singapore